Verna Rae Harrah (née Harrison; July 25, 1944 – June 29, 2012) was an American film producer. She was the widow of William F. Harrah, the hotel and casino magnate. She contributed to many charities and philanthropic causes.

Selected filmography
 Anaconda (1997) (producer)
 Who's Your Daddy? (2002) (producer)
 Vacuums (2003) (producer)
 Anacondas: The Hunt for the Blood Orchid (2004) (producer)
 The Canyon (2009) (executive producer)

References

External links
 
 

1944 births
2012 deaths
American film producers
People from Nampa, Idaho